Greek Fire is an American rock band from St. Louis, Missouri. The band was formed in 2008 by members of Story of the Year and Maybe Today. Since formation, Greek Fire has released a self-titled EP, a single titled "Doesn't Matter Anyway", on August 16, 2011, they released their debut, full-length album, Deus Ex Machina, and have recently announced a new addition to the Lost/Found EPs titled Broken set to be released before Found.

History

Formation (2008–09)
In May 2009, Philip Sneed aka Moon Valjean and Ryan Phillips (both from Story of the Year) joined with Johnny Venus and Mark Joseph Roth (both from Maybe Today) to start performing as the band Greek Fire.  While their first official show was on May 16, 2009, the band's short documentary posted on YouTube specifies that the band formed in 2008.

Debut EP and "Doesn't Matter Anyway" (2009–10)
Greek Fire posted numerous demos (including some teaser clips) since forming, the oldest of which are their songs titled "Dreaming in Deja Vu", "The Ride", and "Down In Mexico" which first appeared on MySpace.

Greek Fire released a three-song EP on November 19, 2010, while they continued to write and record music for a currently unreleased full-length album. Greek Fire went to the studio in late January 2011 to record. Greek Fire released "Doesn't Matter Anyway" to iTunes on March 10, 2011. "Doesn't Matter Anyway" has received considerable radio play in St. Louis on 105.7 ThePOINT KPNT, Sirius Satellite Radio, KSHE95, and in Chicago at Q101 since then.

Deus Ex Machina (2011–12)
Greek Fire played several live performances at venues throughout the midwest: Fubar Lounge, Pops Nightclub and Verizon Wireless Amphitheater in Saint Louis, MO (where they opened for Incubus on August 20, 2011, and played in POINTFest in May and September 2011), as well as many other locations including Columbia, MO (where they opened for Good Charlotte), Toledo OH, Grand Rapids MI and Chicago IL where they opened for the band Madina Lake.

On August 1, 2011, Greek Fire announced that they would be releasing their independent debut album Deus Ex Machina on August 16, 2011, through many outlets, online and otherwise.

In support of Deus Ex Machina the band toured with Eve 6 and played Pointfest along with Megadeth, Incubus, P.O.D., Chevelle, HURT and more, and played Uproar with Godsmack, Staind, Papa Roach, Shinedown, Thousand Foot Krutch and Adelitas Way.

Lost/Broken/Found (2012–present)
The band announced at the 2012 HoHo show that their next album will be entitled Lost/Found. The first single, "A Real Life" from the record was released March 12, 2013. The second single "Top Of The World" was released on December 2, 2013, and a stripped-down version was released February 21, 2014.

The band later announced that the concept album would instead be released as 2 EPs called Lost and Found respectively. The Lost EP was released on May 13, 2014.

They later added a third EP to be released before Found titled Broken

James Gunn, a St. Louis native, planned to feature the band in the soundtrack to Guardians of the Galaxy, but ultimately decided to stay with a mix of 1970's music.

In September 2014, "Top Of The World" was featured in a commercial spot for Disney's Big Hero 6, while "A Real Life" was featured in a November episode of The Bold and the Beautiful.

After Sneed parted ways with Story of the Year, Ryan Phillips also left Greek Fire.  Chris Hobbs from Cavo has replaced him on at least a touring basis.

Sneed (aka moon) is now a member of the "Rizzuto Show" on 105.7 THE POINT

Johnny Venus illness
While touring in Japan in early 2012, Johnny Venus started to feel exhaustion. After the tour in Japan, Venus's exhaustion did not fade. When he returned home, he had some blood tests. Hours after the blood tests, Venus was admitted to the hospital with a diagnosis of Acute promyelocytic leukemia. Venus had no medical insurance. While he was recovering and receiving treatment, the band asked Story of the Year singer, Dan Marsala, to play drums with Greek Fire. Marsala did so for the months of June and July. Venus completed his first round of treatment in early August. On November 10, 2012, Venus made his official return to the group in a show at Missouri University of Science and Technology. He has declared himself cancer-free and has returned to touring with the band.

Musical style
The band describes themselves this way:

Members

Current members
Philip "Moon Valjean" Sneed - lead vocals, piano, rhythm guitar, keyboards, synthesizers (2008–present)
Mark Joseph Roth - bass guitar, backing vocals (2008–present)
Johnny Venus - drums, percussion (2008–present)
Chris Hobbs - guitar (2018–present)

Touring Members
Dan Marsala - drums, percussion (2012)

Past members
Ryan Phillips - guitar (2008–2018)

Discography

Studio albums

Extended plays 
 Greek Fire (2010)
 LOST (2014)
 ORIENTATION (2018)

Singles

Music videos

References

External links
Greek Fire on YouTube
Greek Fire on Tumblr
Awards for Greek Fire

Musical groups from St. Louis